KUSD is an FM radio station in Vermillion, South Dakota, USA. It is the flagship station of the South Dakota Public Broadcasting radio network.

Translators

External links
South Dakota Public Broadcasting

USD-FM
NPR member stations
Vermillion, South Dakota
Mitchell, South Dakota
Mass media in the Mitchell, South Dakota micropolitan area